Actin, gamma-enteric smooth muscle is a protein that in humans is encoded by the ACTG2 gene.

Actins are highly conserved proteins that are involved in various types of cell motility, and maintenance of the cytoskeleton.  In vertebrates, three main groups of actin isoforms, alpha, beta and gamma have been identified.  The alpha actins are found in muscle tissues and are a major constituent of the contractile apparatus.  The beta and gamma actins co-exist in most cell types as components of the cytoskeleton, and as mediators of internal cell motility.  Actin, gamma 2, encoded by this gene, is a smooth muscle actin found in enteric tissues.

Interactions
ACTG2 has been shown to interact with Emerin.

References

External links

Further reading

Human proteins